Macy Nulman (1923 – November 29, 2011) was an American Orthodox cantor and a scholar of Jewish music and Jewish liturgy.

Personal background 
Nulman was married to Sarah, with whom he raised Judy Z. Nulman-Koenigsberg (married to David I. Koenigsberg) and Efrem Nulman (married to Rochelle).

Professional background 
Aside from once serving as cantor of Anshei Sefard Congregation of Boro Park, Etz Chaim of Flatbush, and several other congregations in the United States, he served as the director of the Philip and Sarah Belz School of Jewish Music at Yeshiva University until his retirement (1983). He has taught Jewish music at Brooklyn College and appeared on several educational radio and television programs. Nulman, among others, founded the Cantorial Council of America (the sister organization of the Rabbinical Council of America), and he served for some time as the editor of the Journal of Jewish Music and Liturgy.  Articles of his ranged from the scholarly to the popular, writing several articles on Jewish liturgy for MyJewishLearning.com.

Published works 
 Concise Encyclopedia of Jewish Music (1975), Mcgraw Hill 
 Concepts of Jewish Music and Prayer (1985)
 Encyclopedia of Jewish Prayer: Ashkenazic and Sephardic Rites (1993)

References 

American Orthodox Jews
1923 births
2011 deaths
Brooklyn College faculty